True North is the thirteenth studio album by Christian singer-songwriter Twila Paris, released on September 21, 1999 by Sparrow Records. The album is produced by CCM recording artist and musician Charlie Peacock, who has worked with Paris on her 1990 album Cry for the Desert as a backing vocalist and playing keyboards. The last song on True North, "When You Speak to Me" features guest vocals by Jars of Clay's lead singer Dan Haseltine. The album climbed to number 112 on the Top 200 Albums and number 5 on the Top Christian Albums charts in Billboard magazine.

Track listing

Critical reception 

Steve Huey of AllMusic said that Paris "returns to the adult contemporary style for which she's best known, and which made 1996's 'Where I Stand' her most popular record. 'True North' is a solidly constructed record, aimed squarely at radio airplay and highlighted by a few strong, obvious singles, which help make up for the occasional lackluster track."

John Baugh of Cross Rhythms said that True North is "sounding very good indeed, but then that is all you would expect with one Charlie Peacock producing. On the other side you get lyrics that really touch the heart, focusing on Jesus and our response to him, both in an immediate worship context and in our daily lives." Baugh also mentions that the album has "a 'rootsy' feel than some previous recordings and it does allow the radiance of Twila's voice to shine through."

Personnel 

 Twila Paris – lead vocals, acoustic piano (6), backing vocals (8)
 Charlie Peacock – electric piano (1–5, 8, 9, 10) backing vocals (1, 8), ambient synthesizers (6)
 Reece Wynans – Hammond B3 organ (1, 5, 8, 9)
 Tony Miracle – keyboards (2, 7)
 Mark Hammond – keyboards (3, 4, 5)
 Pat Coil – grand piano (7, 11)
 Tim Lauer – pump organ (7, 11)
 Scott Denté – acoustic guitar (1, 2, 4, 5, 8, 9, 10)
 Kenny Greenberg – electric guitars (1–5, 8, 9, 10)
 Mark Baldwin – gut-string guitar (3)
 Jerry McPherson – acoustic guitar (8)
 Mark Hill – bass (1–4, 7–10)
 James Genus – bass (5), acoustic bass (6)
 Steve Brewster – drums (1–5, 7–10)
 Eric Darken – percussion
 Bob Mason – cello (2, 5, 6, 8)
 David Davidson – violin (2, 5, 8)
 Tom Howard – orchestra arrangements and conductor (7, 11)
 The Nashville String Machine – orchestra (7, 11)
 Chris Carmichael – fiddle solo (8)
 Chris Eaton – backing vocals (1–5, 8, 9, 10)
 Natalie Grant – backing vocals (tracks 1–6, 9)
 Darwin Hobbs – backing vocals (1–6, 9)
 Tiffany Palmer – backing vocals (1–6, 9, 10)
 Duawne Starling – backing vocals (6)
 Samuel Brinsley Ashworth – backing vocals (8)
 Dan Haseltine – guest vocals (11)

Production

 Charlie Peacock – producer
 Lynn Nichols – executive producer
 Norman Miller – executive producer
 Richie Biggs – recording at Re:think Studio, mixing at Re:think Studio (6–11)
 Shane D. Wilson – additional recording (2, 7)
 David Schober – orchestra recording at The Bennett House
 Shawn McLean – orchestra recording assistant
 David Leonard – mixing at East Iris (1–5)
 Charlie Brocco – mix assistant (1–5)
 David Streit – mix assistant (6–11)
 Gil Gowing – mix assistant (6–11), digital editing, sequencing
 Glenn Meadows – mastering at Masterfonics
 Molly Nicholas – project administrator

All track information and credits were taken from the CD liner notes.

Charts

Radio singles

References

1999 albums
Twila Paris albums
Sparrow Records albums
Albums produced by Charlie Peacock